W-VHS (Wide-VHS) is an HDTV-capable analog recording videocassette format created by JVC. The format was originally introduced in 1994 for use with Japan's Hi-Vision, an early analog high-definition television system.

Naming 
JVC gives four reasons for naming the format "Wide-VHS":

 Wide aspect ratio
 Worldwide-usable format, conforming to foreign HDTV systems
 Wide development of videotape applications
 Wide (two-track) recording system

Mechanism 
W-VHS VCRs can record a high-definition video signal (1035i to 1080i, stored internally as an 1125-line signal similar to Hi-Vision) via the analog Y/Pb/Pr component interface, a standard-definition signal (480i), or two simultaneous standard-definition signals, for 3D video.

The recording medium of W-VHS is a -inch double-coated metal particle tape stored in a cartridge similar to, but incompatible with VHS. Some W-VHS VCRs are capable of playing and recording VHS and S-VHS media.

Unlike normal VHS, which uses a single head to record video fields as a series of parallel standalone tracks, W-VHS uses a dual-head design to record each video field as two parallel tracks storing a component video signal. The signal is recorded using a method called "time compression integration" in which the luminance signal is divided into two sets of lines, which are then split and recorded across both tracks. After the luminance signals are recorded, the two color signals are recorded, one on each track, in a time-compressed form. Recording these signals sequentially rather than side by side prevents crosstalk between the luma and chroma components.

Because the video signals are recorded in component form instead of e.g. the "color-under" method used by S-VHS, standard-definition image quality for W-VHS is typically much higher, due to the lack of noise caused by a chroma sub-carrier. Audio is stored as a digital PCM stream.

Use 
Due to its high cost, W-VHS equipment and media was distributed in the United States through JVC's professional video and broadcast equipment division and was primarily marketed for industrial and commercial applications such as medical imaging.
 
Currently, it is very difficult to find either W-VHS VCRs or tapes. If W-VHS media is not available, JVC recommends the use of tapes intended for the D-9 or "Digital-S" digital video format.

The running time between W-VHS and Digital-S is not the same; a Digital-S tape with a length of 64 min is approximately 105 min when used with W-VHS.

See also 
 D-VHS
 S-VHS
 Blu-ray Disc

References

External links 

Quadruplex Park vtr formats, with a mention of W-VHS

Videotape
VHS
Products introduced in 1994
Japanese inventions